Elandurai is a village in Kumbakonam taluk, Thanjavur district, Tamil Nadu.

Demographics 

As per the 2001 census, Elandurai had a population of 1046 with 523 males and 523 females. The sex ratio was 1000 and the literacy rate, 74.68.

References 

 

Villages in Thanjavur district